Dieter "Didi" Hallervorden (born 5 September 1935) is a German comedian, actor, singer, and cabaret artist.
He achieved great popularity in German-speaking countries in the mid-1970s with the slapstick series Nonstop Nonsens and his character Didi.

In the early 2010s, he was able to increasingly establish himself as a character actor of serious roles in films such as Back on Track (2013) and Head Full of Honey (2014).

Biography

Dieter Hallervorden's mother was a physician's assistant and his father a graduate engineer employed by German aircraft maker Junkers. His siblings are called Renate and Margot. Dieter Hallervorden has two children (Dieter Hallervorden Jr. and Nathalie Hallervorden) from his marriage to Rotraud Schindler, a daughter (Laura) from another relationship, and a son (Johannes) from his current wife Elena Blume.

Dieter Hallervorden Jr. appeared in the movies Darf ich Sie zur Mutter machen (1968) and The Wedding Trip (1969) and was creator, co-writer and leading actor of the comedy show Nonstop Nonsens (1974–1980). Nathalie Hallervorden co-starred in the TV series Die Nervensäge (1985–1986) and had a brief appearance together with her parents in Nonstop Nonsens. Hallervorden's first wife, Rotraud Schindler, co-starred in several TV shows and some movies. Johannes Hallervorden plays the part of Melchior von und zu Panke, the ghost from the TV series Binny and the Ghost.

Hallervorden starred as a bumbling, Clouseau-like detective in the German television show Die Didi-Show. The show was dubbed into English, retitled Didi's Comedy Show, and shown in various countries. Hallervorden also released a number of music singles, often parodies of popular songs, among them "Du, die Wanne ist voll", a very successful parody cover of "You're the One That I Want".

An Afrikaans-subtitled version of the comedy sketch-show, Nonstop Nonsens (1975), starring Hallervorden, was broadcast in South Africa in the early 1980s under the title Grapjas Didi ("Didi the Joker" or alternatively "Didi the Prankster").  Also a Spanish-dubbed version was also distributed for Latin America under the name Las Locuras de Didí ("The Madnesses of Didi").

In recent years, Hallervorden was popular with the leading roles in the comedy-drama films Back on Track and Head Full of Honey. He provided the voice for Vlad in the German dub of Hotel Transylvania 2.

Since 1988, Dieter Hallervorden has lived in Trégastel (France) in the castle, Château de Costaérès. In 2007 he was announced as an honorary citizen of his birthtown Dessau-Roßlau. On September 4, 2022 he opened the "Mitteldeutsches Theater" in Dessau-Roßlau. The theater shows Hallervordens own productions as well as guest performances and readings by German artists, comedians and actors.

Filmography

TV shows

Awards
1981 Bambi (for his role in Nonstop Nonsens)
1996 Telestar (Best Host in "Verstehen Sie Spaß?")
2003 Deutscher Comedypreis (Honorary Award)
2005 Bayerischer Kabarettpreis (Honorary Award)
2006 Honorary Citizen of the German city Dessau
2013 Goldene Kamera (for his lifework, Honorary Award)

References

External links
More info and some videos (in German)
Official site of the German Hallervorden DVD-Distributor (with forum)
 

1935 births
Living people
People from Dessau-Roßlau
People from the Free State of Anhalt
German male comedians
German male film actors
German male television actors
20th-century German male actors
21st-century German male actors
German male singers
German-language singers
German Film Award winners
Recipients of the Order of Merit of Berlin